Viktor Viktorovych Chanov (21 July 1959 – 8 February 2017) was a Ukrainian football goalkeeper. Throughout the 1980s in the former USSR, Chanov played mainly for FC Dynamo Kyiv.

Club career
Chanov was born in Stalino, Ukrainian SSR, Soviet Union. He joined the local club Shakhtar Donetsk at an early age, along with his brother Vyacheslav, also a goalkeeper. During the late 1970s to early 1980s Chanov performed exceptionally well and attracted the attention of the great Dynamo Kyiv. He transferred to Dynamo to compete for the number 1 jersey with Mykhaylo Mykhaylov, another goalkeeper of massive potential.

Initially, the moustached Chanov ousted Mikhailov and forced his way also into the USSR squad for the 1982 FIFA World Cup in Spain, as second choice behind Rinat Dasaev. Chanov won league titles in his first two seasons at Dynamo and was the first-choice keeper throughout, however injury forced him out of some games in early 1985, and Mikhailov regained his position. Chanov returned to fitness midway through the season but was unable to dislodge Mikhailov, whose form had persuaded Valery Lobanovsky to persist with him. Dynamo Kyiv won the cup that year and Mikhailov was instrumental in the success.

In 1986, Lobanovsky had decisions to make on the goalkeeping front. Chanov was selected as the first-choice goalkeeper, and was in goal as Dynamo lifted the European Cup Winners Cup, defeating Atlético Madrid 3–0 in Lyon. He played with an injured hand in the final. Chanov played 202 games for Dynamo.

Israel
In 1990, Chanov played out his last season Dynamo Kyiv and moved to spend his remaining days in Israel with Maccabi Haifa. He was signed by then-manager Shlomo Sharf to take the place of Giora Antman, arriving in Israel two days after Antman gave up five goals in a 5–0 drubbing by Maccabi Netanya. Chanov was immediately successful in goal, breaking a club record of four clean sheets in his first four matches. He won a league and cup double in his first season and later added the Israeli cup.

International career
In the summer of 1986 Chanov travelled to Mexico for the World Cup Finals with the USSR squad, again as back-up for Dasaev. He made a solitary appearance against Canada in a "dead rubber" match at the end of the first-round stage.

He was yet again a reserve for the USSR at Euro 1988 in West Germany, appearing once as a 69th-minute substitute against the Republic of Ireland after Dasaev was injured while making a challenge on Tony Galvin.

Death
Chanov was murdered in February 2017. The identity of the killer remains unknown.

Honours
 With Shakhtar Donetsk
 Soviet Cup: 1980
 With FC Dynamo Kyiv
 Soviet Top League: 1985, 1986, 1990
 Soviet Cup: 1985, 1986, 1990
 UEFA Cup Winners Cup: 1986
 With Maccabi Haifa FC
 Israeli Premier League: 1991
 Israeli Cup: 1991, 1993
 Individual
 Berlin Britz Radio World Goalkeeper of the Year: 1986

References

External links
 Profile of Viktor Chanov on Maccabi Haifa's official website 
 

1959 births
2017 deaths
Burials at Baikove Cemetery
Viktor
Footballers from Donetsk
Association football goalkeepers
Soviet footballers
Soviet expatriate footballers
Ukrainian expatriate footballers
1982 FIFA World Cup players
1986 FIFA World Cup players
UEFA Euro 1988 players
1990 FIFA World Cup players
Soviet Top League players
FC Dynamo Kyiv players
FC Shakhtar Donetsk players
Maccabi Haifa F.C. players
Bnei Yehuda Tel Aviv F.C. players
FC Arsenal Kyiv players
Expatriate footballers in Israel
Soviet expatriate sportspeople in Israel
Ukrainian expatriate sportspeople in Israel
Ukrainian people of Russian descent
Soviet Union international footballers
Ukrainian Premier League managers
FC Arsenal Kyiv managers
Ukrainian football managers
Male murder victims
Deaths by beating in Europe
Ukrainian murder victims
People murdered in Ukraine
Recipients of the Order of Merit (Ukraine), 2nd class